Isuf Kalo (1942 – 19 January 2023) was an Albanian doctor and professor of medicine.

Born in Luzat, Tepelenë, Albania, Kalo completed his studies at the Faculty of Medicine in Tirana University in 1964. He specialized in several European countries in diabetology and endocrinology. He was one of the pioneers of this domain in Albania. For several years he was chair of endocrinology and metabolic diseases in the Faculty of Medicine and in the University Hospital of Tirana. He was a Doctor of Medical Sciences, Professor of Medicine and
honoured with the Distinguished Scientist Worker Award of Albania. Until 1985 he was the personal doctor of the communist dictator Enver Hoxha.

Between 1991 and 2004 Kalo was employed by the World Health Organization's Regional Office for Europe (in Copenhagen), heading the European Diabetes Program and later the Quality of Health System Programme in Europe. He was the author of a series of publications in the medical press of his country and abroad, and he was an honorary member of several international committees and medical associations in Europe.

References

1942 births
2023 deaths
People from Tepelenë
Albanian diabetologists
Albanian endocrinologists
University of Tirana alumni
World Health Organization officials
Albanian officials of the United Nations